Antonella Elia (born  1 November 1963) is an Italian television personality and actress.

Life and career 
Born in Turin,  Elia started her career as a model and made her television debut in 1989 in a minor role in the TV-series The Betrothed. She became first known as the assistant of Corrado in the Canale 5 variety show La Corrida, a role she had between 1990 and 1993. In 1991 she was cast in the successful variety television Non è la Rai, and between 1993 and 1996 she was sidekick of Raimondo Vianello in the Italia 1 program Pressing. She participated to the second edition of the Raidue reality show L'Isola dei Famosi in 2004, and she returned in the edition of 2012, winning the show and donating the 100,000 euro prize to Amnesty International. She is also active in films, TV-series and on stage.

References

External links 
 
 

Italian film actresses
Italian television actresses
Italian stage actresses
1963 births
Actors from Turin
Living people
Participants in Italian reality television series
Mass media people from Turin